Wilhelm Dybäck (11 May 1877 – 22 September 1933) was a Swedish sports shooter. He competed in the 100m running deer, double shot event at the 1912 Summer Olympics.

References

External links
 

1877 births
1933 deaths
Swedish male sport shooters
Olympic shooters of Sweden
Shooters at the 1912 Summer Olympics
People from Gävle
Sportspeople from Gävleborg County